The Nottinghamshire, Lincolnshire & Derbyshire Rugby Football Union (NLD RFU) is a governing body for rugby union in part of The Midlands, England. The union is the constituent body of the Rugby Football Union for the counties of Nottinghamshire and Lincolnshire and Derbyshire, with each county having also having their own sub-unions with additional club cup competitions. As well as overseeing club rugby, the Notts, Lincs and Derbyshire RFU also administers the county representative teams.

History 

The Notts, Lincs & Derbyshire Rugby Football Union was formed in 1926. Prior to this clubs in the region had been members of the Midland Counties Football Union which had dissolved several years earlier in 1920.

County team

The Notts, Lincs & Derbyshire senior men's side currently play in the third division of County Championship rugby union. They reached their first County County Championship final in 1986, losing 12-9 to Middlesex at Twickenham Stadium, back when it was a single competition. They had to wait another 20 years for another Twickenham final, finally winning their first county silverware in 2006 when they defeated Oxfordshire 21 - 17 to claim the County Championship Shield. In recent years the team has struggled, at one point even having to drop out of the 2018 County Championship Shield, before returning for the 2019 competition.

Honours
County Championship Shield winners: 2006

Affiliated clubs

There are 60 clubs currently affiliated to NLD RFU, listed below.
Source:

Nottinghamshire

 Ashfield
 Bingham
 East Leeke
 East Retford
 Keyworth
 Mansfield
 Mansfield Woodhouse
 Meden Vale
 Mellish
 Newark
 Nottingham
 Nottingham Casuals
 Nottingham Corsairs
 Nottingham Moderns
 Nottingham Trent University
 Nottinghamians
 Ollerton
 Paviors
 Southwell
 Sutton Bonnington Agricultural College
 University of Nottingham
 West Bridgford
 Worksop

Lincolnshire

 Barton and District
 Boston
 Bourne
 Cleethorpes
 Gainsborough
 Grimsby
 Horncastle
 Kesteven
 Lincoln
 Lincolnshire Police
 Market Rasen & Louth
 North Hykeham
 Scunthorpe
 Skegness
 Sleaford
 Spalding
 Stamford College Old Boys
 Stamford
 University of Lincoln

Derbyshire

 Amber Valley
 Ashbourne
 Bakewell Mannerians
 Belper
 Buxton
 Castle Donington
 Chesterfield Panthers
 Derby
 Derbyshire Constabulary
 Dronfield
 Glossop
 Hope Valley
 Ilkeston
 Leesbrook
 Long Eaton
 Matlock
 Melbourne
 Rolls Royce
 Tupton

Notts, Lincs & Derbyshire club competitions 

The Notts, Lincs & Derbyshire currently run the following competitions for club sides in the region:

Cups

Notts, Lincs & Derbyshire Senior Cup
Notts, Lincs & Derbyshire Senior Shield
Notts, Lincs & Derbyshire Senior Plate
Notts, Lincs & Derbyshire Senior Vase

Discontinued competitions

Midlands 5 East (North) – tier 10 league that ran between 2006 and 2018
Notts, Lincs & Derbyshire 1 – tier 7-9 league that ran between 1987 and 2000
Notts, Lincs & Derbyshire 2 – tier 8-10 league that ran between 1987 and 2000
Notts, Lincs & Derbyshire 3 – tier 9-11 league that ran between 1987 and 2000
Notts, Lincs & Derbyshire 4 – tier 10-13 league that ran between 1987 and 1996
Notts, Lincs & Derbyshire 5 – tier 11 league that ran between 1990 and 1992
Notts, Lincs & Derbyshire/Leicestershire 1 East – tier 9 league for Notts, Lincs and east Leicestershire clubs that ran between 2000 and 2004
Notts, Lincs & Derbyshire/Leicestershire 1 West – tier 9 league for Notts, Derbyshire and west Leicestershire clubs that ran between 2000 and 2004
Notts, Lincs & Derbyshire/Leicestershire 2 East – tier 10 league for Notts, Lincs and east Leicestershire clubs that ran between 2000 and 2004
Notts, Lincs & Derbyshire/Leicestershire 2 West – tier 10 league for Notts, Derbyshire and west Leicestershire clubs that ran between 2000 and 2004

Sub-union club competitions 

Additionally, the Nottinghamshire, Lincolnshire and Derbyshire rugby football unions run their own competitions alongside the main NLD cups.

Nottinghamshire
Nottinghamshire Senior Cup
Nottinghamshire Intermediate Cup
Nottinghamshire Junior Cup

Lincolnshire
Lincolnshire Senior Cup
Lincolnshire Intermediate Cup

Derbyshire
Derbyshire 1st XV Cup
Derbyshire 1st XV Shield
Derbyshire 2nd XV Cup
Derbyshire Presidents Trophy
Derbyshire Pennant

See also
Midland Division
English rugby union system

References

External links 
 
 Nottinghamshire RFU

Rugby union governing bodies in England
Rugby union in Nottinghamshire
Rugby union in Derbyshire
Rugby union in Lincolnshire